Unkana (Matsumura, 1935) is an invalid name for a genus of planthoppers in the family Delphacidae. The genus name Unkana was previously coined for a genus of skipper butterflies, so Matsumura's name is permanently unavailable and invalid under the rules of the ICZN.

Species
Unkana contains the following species.

U. arisana (Matsumura, 1935)
U. heitonis (Matsumura, 1935)
U. malayana (Matsumura, 1935)
U. nigrifacies (Matsumura, 1935)
U. n. hyalipennis (Matsumura, 1935)
U. sakaguchii (Matsumura, 1935)
U. taiwanella (Matsumura, 1935)

References

Delphacidae
Taxa described in 1935
Auchenorrhyncha genera
Controversial taxa